The 2009 Asian Weightlifting Championships were held in Taldykorgan, Kazakhstan between May 11 and May 15, 2009. It was the 40th men's and 21st women's championship.

Medal summary

Men

Women

Medal table 

Ranking by Big (Total result) medals 

Ranking by all medals: Big (Total result) and Small (Snatch and Clean & Jerk)

Participating nations 
157 athletes from 22 nations competed.

 (3)
 (14)
 (10)
 (15)
 (9)
 (8)
 (13)
 (3)
 (15)
 (6)
 (3)
 (8)
 (7)
 (1)
 (7)
 (1)
 (1)
 (9)
 (8)
 (3)
 (5)
 (8)

References
Results
Final Report
Results

Asian Weightlifting Championships
Asian
W
International weightlifting competitions hosted by Kazakhstan